Sander Moen Foss (born 31 December 1998) is a Norwegian football defender who plays for Sandefjord.

Raised in Barkåker and Stokke, he made his senior debut there in 2014 before joining Eik-Tønsberg. In 2016 he went on to Sandefjord and made his debut in the cup. More cup games followed in 2018 and 2019, as well as loans to FK Tønsberg in 2016 and 2017. He made his league debut for Sandefjord in 2019, in 1. divisjon, and the Eliteserien debut in June 2020.

References

1998 births
Living people
People from Stokke
Norwegian footballers
Eik-Tønsberg players
Sandefjord Fotball players
FK Tønsberg players
Norwegian First Division players
Eliteserien players
Association football defenders
Sportspeople from Vestfold og Telemark